African records in athletics are the best marks set in a track and field and road running events by an athlete who competes for a member nation of the Confederation of African Athletics (CAA). The organisation is responsible for ratification and it analyses each record before approving it. Records may be set in any continent and at any competition, providing that the correct measures are in place (such as wind-gauges) to allow for a verifiable and legal mark.

Outdoor
Key to tables:

+ = en route to a longer distance

h = hand timing

A = affected by altitude

Mx = mixed race

Wo = woman only race

NWI = no wind measurement

# = not ratified by federation

a = aided road course according to IAAF rule 260.28

X = annulled due to doping violation

OT = oversized track (> 200m in circumference)

Men

Women

Mixed

Indoor

Men

Women

See also

Notes

References
General
CAA: African Outdoor Records 8 March 2022 updated
CAA: African Indoor Records 8 March 2022 updated
Specific

External links
CAA web site
World Athletics: African Records

 African
Athletics in Africa